Dominic Young (born 9 August 2001) is an English professional rugby league footballer who plays as a er for the Newcastle Knights in the  NRL and England at international level.

He previously played for the Huddersfield Giants in the Super League.

Background
Young was born in Wakefield, West Yorkshire, England in the United Kingdom and is of Jamaican descent. He is a product of the Huddersfield Giants academy system.

His brother Alex Young plays for Workington Town and Jamaica at international level.

Playing career

2019
In round 18 of the Super League XXIV season, Young made his Super League debut for Huddersfield against St. Helens at the age of 17.

2020
On 7 August, it was announced that Young had signed a three-year contract with Australian side, Newcastle Knights in the National Rugby League starting in 2021.

2021
In round 3 of the 2021 season, Young made his NRL debut for the Knights against the Wests Tigers, playing in the centres as a replacement for the injured Bradman Best. Young made a total of six appearances for Newcastle in the 2021 NRL season scoring four tries.
He was set to represent Jamaica at the 2021 Rugby League World Cup however the tournament was postponed due to the Covid-19 pandemic.

2022
In round 16 of the 2022 NRL season, Young scored a hat-trick in Newcastle's 38-12 win over the bottom placed Gold Coast side. In round 23, Young scored two tries for Newcastle in a 22-28 loss against Canberra. In round 25, Young scored two tries in a 16-38 loss against Cronulla.

On 15 September, Young made his debut for England at the 2021 Rugby League World Cup against Samoa scoring two tries in a 60-6 victory. In the second group stage match, Young scored a further two tries for England as they defeated France 42-18.
In the third group stage match, Young scored four tries for England in their 94-4 victory over Greece.

2023
In February 2023, Young signed a four-year deal to join the Sydney Roosters starting in 2024.

References

External links
Newcastle Knights profile
Huddersfield Giants profile
England profile

2001 births
Living people
England national rugby league team players
English rugby league players
English people of Jamaican descent
Huddersfield Giants players
Newcastle Knights players
Rugby league wingers
Rugby league centres
Rugby league players from Yorkshire